Stenanthemum leucophractum, commonly known as rusty poison, white cryptandra or white stenanthemum, is a species of flowering plant in the family Rhamnaceae and is endemic to south-eastern continental Australia. It is a spreading shrub or subshrub with softly-hairy young stems, egg-shaped to fan-shaped leaves and heads of white or yellowish flowers surrounded by white, felt-like floral leaves.

Description
Both surfaces of the leaves are covered with whitish or rust-coloured hairs.

Taxonomy and naming
Stenanthemum leucophractum was first formally described in 1847 by Diederich Franz Leonhard von Schlechtendal who gave it the name Cryptandra leucophracta in the journal Linnaea. In 1858, Siegfried Reissek changed the name to Stenanthemum leucophractum. The specific epithet (leucophractum) means "white-protected", referring to the floral leaves.

Distribution and habitat
Rusty poison grows in mallee and is found in north-western Victoria, including in the Little Desert National Park, from the Eyre Peninsula to Kangaroo Island in South Australia, and between the Ardlethan and Hillston districts of inland New South Wales.

References

leucophractum
Rosales of Australia
Flora of New South Wales
Flora of Victoria (Australia)
Flora of South Australia
Plants described in 1847
Taxa named by Diederich Franz Leonhard von Schlechtendal